The Old Cedar Baptist Church near Owenton, Kentucky, is a historic church built in 1929.  It was added to the National Register in 1997.  It is located at the northeast corner of U.S. Route 127 and Kentucky Route 607, in Owen County, Kentucky.

It was designed by Rev. Edward N. Lawson and was built over a period of 20 years starting in 1929.

It is a two-story, stone Classical Revival-style church.

References

Baptist churches in Kentucky
Churches on the National Register of Historic Places in Kentucky
Neoclassical architecture in Kentucky
Churches completed in 1949
National Register of Historic Places in Owen County, Kentucky
Neoclassical church buildings in the United States
1949 establishments in Kentucky